is the 14th single by all-girl J-pop group Berryz Kobo, released on June 27, 2007 on the Piccolo Town label (distributed by King Records). The single was released both as a normal, CD-only edition and a limited edition with a bonus DVD. The limited edition also contained a Berryz Kobo photo-card. An entry ticket to the launch event on July 1 was included with the first copies of the limited edition. Later, a "B" limited edition was released, including a bonus photobook. The Single V was released on July 11, 2007. The single peaked at #4 on the weekly Oricon charts, the group's new personal high, charting for three weeks; the Single V peaked at #17 and charted for two weeks.

The PV for the single was shot entirely on location in Tokyo, in a park near Yotsuya.

Details 
 Main vocals: Miyabi Natsuyaki, Risako Sugaya
 Minor vocals: Momoko Tsugunaga, Yurina Kumai
 Center: Risako Sugaya

Track listings

CD
 
Composition and Lyrics: Tsunku, arrangement: Shōichirō Hirata)
 
Composition and Lyrics: Tsunku, arrangement: Takao Konishi)

Limited edition DVD

Single V

References

External links 
 Kokuhaku no Funsui Hiroba at the official Hello! Project discography
 Kokuhaku no Funsui Hiroba (Single V) at the official Hello! Project discography
 Kokuhaku no Funsui Hiroba at the official Up-Front Works discography

Berryz Kobo songs
2007 singles
Songs written by Tsunku
Song recordings produced by Tsunku
2007 songs
Piccolo Town singles